Jansen is an unincorporated community and a census-designated place (CDP) located in and governed by Las Animas County, Colorado, United States. The population of the Jansen CDP was 112 at the United States Census 2010. The Trinidad post office (Zip Code 81082) serves the Jansen postal addresses.

Geography
Jansen is located in western Las Animas County in the valley of the Purgatoire River. Colorado State Highway 12 passes through the community, leading northeast  to Trinidad, the county seat, and west  to Cokedale.

Demographics

See also

Outline of Colorado
Index of Colorado-related articles
State of Colorado
Colorado cities and towns
Colorado census designated places
Colorado counties
Las Animas County, Colorado

References

External links

Las Animas County website

Census-designated places in Las Animas County, Colorado
Census-designated places in Colorado